Georg von Rauch  (1947–1971) was a radical activist in West Berlin at the end of the 1960s German student movement.

See also 
 West Berlin Tupamaros
 Movement 2 June
 Rauch-Haus-Song

References
 Ingrid Gilcher-Holtey, A Revolution of Perception ? Consequences and Echoes of 1968, Berghahn Books, 2014, p. 79.

1947 births
1971 deaths
People from Marburg
People of Baltic German descent
German anarchists
Sozialistischer Deutscher Studentenbund members
Members of the 2 June Movement
Deaths by firearm in Germany